The Tozhu Tuvans, Tozhu Tuvinians, Todzhan Tuvans or Todzhinians (own name: Тугалар Tugalar or Тухалар Tukhalar; Russian Тувинцы-тоджинцы Tuvincy-todžincy, Тоджинцы Todžincy) are a Turkic subgroup of the Tuvans living in Todzhinsky District of Tuva Republic. The Tozhu Tuvans are reindeer herders.

Language 
The language of Tozhu Tuvan people is a subdialect of Eastern (or Northeastern) dialect of Tuvan language.

References

Bibliography 
Chadamba, Z. B. Тоджинский диалект тувинского языка (The Tozhu dialect of the Tuvan language). Kyzyl: Tuvknigoizdat, 1974
Вайнштейн 1961 – Вайнштейн С.И. Тувинцы-тоджинцы. Историко-этнографические очерки. - М., 1961.
Donahoe 2002 - Donahoe B. "Hey, You! Get offa my Taiga!" : comparing the sense of property rights among the Tofa and Tozhu-Tyva. – Halle/Saale: Max Planck Inst. for Social Anthropology Working Paper Series No. 38, 2002.
Donahoe 2004 - Donahoe B. A line in the Sayans: history and divergent perceptions of property among the Tozhu and Tofa of South Siberia. - Bloomington : Indiana University, 2004.
Donahoe 2006 - Donahoe B. Who owns the Taiga?: inclusive vs. exclusive senses of property among the Tozhu and Tofa of southern Siberia. - In Sibirica (5:1), 2006. - P.87-116.
Донахо 2008 – Донахо Б. Тувинцы-тоджинцы: очерк современной культуры // Тюркские народы Восточной Сибири / Отв. ред. Д.А. Функ, Н.А. Алексеев. М., 2008. С. 186–204.

Tuvans
Ethnic groups in Russia
Ethnic groups in Siberia
Tuva